Daniel Barakat is a Lebanese international rugby league footballer who has played as a  for the Wentworthville Magpies in the Ron Massey Cup. He plays.  

Barakat scored two tries in Wentworthville's 38-4 victory over Auburn Warriors in The 2017 Ron Massey Cup grand final.

Barakat is a Lebanese international.

References

External links
(archived by web.archive.org) Statistics at rlwc2017.com

1981 births
Living people
Lebanese rugby league players
Lebanon national rugby league team players
Rugby league centres
Wentworthville Magpies players